Toka McBaror is a Nigerian filmmaker, producer, movie and music video director born, raised and is based in Kaduna, Kaduna State, Nigeria but originally from Delta State. He received an award nomination for "Kada River" at the 2018 Toronto International Nollywood Film Festival in Canada, 6 award wins for the movie, Lotanna including: "Best Film", "Best Director", "Best Cinematography", "Best Art Director", "Best Costume" and "Best Sound Editor" at the 2017 Golden Movie Awards.

He also has to his awards credits, "Best African Film" and "Best Nollywood Director" from the 2018 Toronto International Nollywood Film Festival, TINFF, which took place in Toronto, Canada. for the movie, The Island, and was again nominated for the "Best Cinematography" and "Best Director" categories at the ZAFAA Global Awards, for his 2017 movie, Lotanna.

Career
In 2011, Mcbaror directed the Nigerian singer, J'odie's musical video, "Kuchi Kuchi (Oh Baby)".

He directed the film, "Blogger's Wife", released to the Nigerian cinemas on Friday, February 10, 2017. The film was produced by Seun Oloketuyi, featuring Nollywood actors and actresses like Segun Arinze, Adejumoke Aderounmu, Deyemi Okanlawon, Ijeoma Grace Agu and Adeniyi Johnson. Still in 2017, "Kada River" a movie produced by him was nominated for an award at the Nollywood Film Festival in Toronto, Canada. At the 2017 Golden Movie Awards, he was nominated in six categories, including: "Best Film", "Best Director", "Best Cinematography", "Best Art Director", "Best Costume", "Best Sound Editor".

In August 2018, the movie which he directed titled, "The Island" was awarded "Best African Film" and himself, "Best Nollywood Director" at the Toronto International Nollywood Film Festival, TIFF, which took place in Toronto, Canada. In September of the same year, he directed the movie, "Merry Men: The Real Yoruba Demons" by Ayo Makun, a popular Nigerian comedian. He was again nominated for the "Best Cinematography" and "Best Director" categories at the ZAFAA Global Awards, for his 2017 movie, Lotanna.

In 2019, he released an action Crime TV Series titled, Paper Boat.

In early 2020, he directed Lilian Afegbai's first movie of the year titled, "Double Strings". Later on February 22 at a press conference in Abuja, he announced the auditioning for his new movie titled, Red Caravan, which he would direct and co-produce, with estimated production cost of N61 million, and is to be shot in Kaduna State. The film centers on epilepsy and is set in the 1880s, at a period when slave trade thrived and is to be acted by about 600 actors and actresses. During the Covid-19 outbreak, McBaror released a web series of short films entitled, The Chronicles, aimed at spreading public awareness on the Coronavirus disease.

By 2021, his first ever attempt at horror movie production, a movie titled Creepy Lives Here had its official trailer released in January  starring Afeez Oyetoro, Nancy Isime, Bimbo Ademoye ex Big Brother Naija (season 3) housemate Temidayo Adenibuyan aka Teddy A, Beverly Osu, and Mike Godson. By February we had our first look at Underbelly Movie which stars Nollywood notable acts like Stan Nze, Femi Adebayo, Ali Nuhu, Maryam Booth and Kunle Coker.

In 2023, he directed Dark October, a film centered on the true life event of the lynching of four young Nigerian students from University of Port Harcourt, who were falsely accused of theft in Aluu area of Port Harcourt popularly known as Aluu Four lynching.

Filmography

Music

Film

Web/TV Series

Awards & nominations

References

External links
 Titles by Toka Mcbaror on New On Netflix UK
 The Island on Film Freeway
 Toka McBaror on Flixanda
 TOKA MCBAROR AID FOUNDATION

Nigerian film producers
Nigerian film directors
Nigerian cinematographers
People from Delta State
People from Kaduna
People from Kaduna State
Living people
Year of birth missing (living people)
Nigerian music video directors
Nigerian sound editors